Funtensee is a karst lake on the Steinernes Meer plateau in Berchtesgaden National Park, Bavaria, Germany. It is located in the larger of two sinkholes (also referred to as uvala). The area is known for record low temperatures, up to 30 °C (54 °F) lower than the surrounding area. Its primary inflows are the Steingraben, Stuhlgraben and Rennergraben streams.

Location

The lake lies at an elevation of 1601 m and has a surface area is 3.5 ha. Its outflow toward the Schrainbach is subterranean at a location called Teufelsmühle. On its shore is the Kärlinger Haus mountain hut which is open for the summer season; in addition, there is a winter room available. The valley is surrounded by the mountains Viehkogel (2,158 m), Glunkerer (1,932 m) and Stuhljoch (2,448 m) which lead to the Funtenseetauern mountain (2,578 m), named after the lake.

History
Earliest evidence of use of the area for grazing can be traced to ca 1604-1619. Around 1870 there was evidence of eight active Kaser (living quarters/stables) causing concerns of overgrazing. The Funtenseealm (hut) was active until 1964.

Temperature
Known as the coldest spot in Germany, the lake is the site where the country's record lowest temperature, was recorded on 24 December 2001. The extreme cold spot at the lake is said to result in a reverse tree line, as no trees can grow at any point below about 60 m above the lake, although studies have found that it may be the result of overgrazing animals. Temperatures are regularly monitored by a private weather station installed by Jörg Kachelmann.

Outflow
The noise of the water disappearing underground has led to local folklore and the naming of the outflowpoint Teufelsmühle (Devil's Mill or Devil's Grinder). The exact route the water takes underground has not yet been established, and an extensive cave has not been ruled out, but the outflow point is not accessible to humans for investigation.

See also
Turlough

References

Lakes of Bavaria
Berchtesgaden Alps